Staraya Balka is a rural locality (a khutor) in Krasnooktyabrskoye Rural Settlement, Pallasovsky District, Volgograd Oblast, Russia. The population was 346 as of 2010. There are 4 streets.

Geography 
Staraya Balka is located 17 km southwest of Pallasovka (the district's administrative centre) by road. Staraya Ivantsovka is the nearest rural locality.

References 

Rural localities in Pallasovsky District